Kalnik is a municipality in the Koprivnica-Križevci County in Croatia, located on the southern slopes of Kalnik mountain. According to the 2011 census, it has 1,351 inhabitants in the following settlements:
 Borje, population 137
 Kalnik, population 325
 Kamešnica, population 189
 Obrež Kalnički, population 139
 Popovec Kalnički, population 98
 Potok Kalnički, population 180
 Šopron, population 162
 Vojnovec Kalnički, population 122

History
In the late 19th century and early 20th century, Kalnik was part of the Bjelovar-Križevci County of the Kingdom of Croatia-Slavonia.

References

Municipalities of Croatia
Populated places in Koprivnica-Križevci County